Gabriel Ceretta Jung (born 12 June 1997) is a Brazilian handball player for SCDR Anaitasuna and the Brazilian national team.

He participated at the 2017 World Men's Handball Championship.

References

1997 births
Living people
Brazilian male handball players
Expatriate handball players
Brazilian expatriate sportspeople in Spain
Handball players at the 2014 Summer Youth Olympics
21st-century Brazilian people